The Institute for Physical Research of the National Academy of Sciences of Armenia is a physics research institute located in Armenia.

History 

Institute for Physical Research (IPR) was founded in 1967 by a prominent Armenian scientist Mikael Levonovich Ter-Mikaelian and currently is one of the leading research institutions in Armenia.

Location 

It is situated near the town of Ashtarak in Aragatsotn province of Armenia, 20 km northwest of capital Yerevan and includes a small scientific settlement called Gitavan, inhabited by the part of its staff and by the scientists of the nearby Institute of Radiophysics and Electronics (IRPhE).

Research Topics and Other Activities

The institute's main research topics are:

Laser physics
Nonlinear optics
Quantum optics
Interaction of radiation with matter
Crystal growth and characterization
Solid-state physics
High-temperature superconductivity
Scientific instrumentation

Besides the research, IPR organizes annually the National Conference on Laser Physics – an authoritative conference attended internationally.

Research Groups 

Many of research groups from IPR have intensive collaboration with European and US research organizations and foundations. The basic research laboratories of the institute are the following:
High-Temperature Superconductivity Laboratory 
Theoretical Physics Laboratory 
Optics Laboratory 
Laboratory of Laser Spectroscopy 
Crystal Growth of Luminescence Materials Laboratory 
Quantum Informatics Laboratory 
Crystal Optics Laboratory 
Solid State Lasers and Spectroscopy 
Solid State Physics Laboratory 
Superconducting Detector's Physics Laboratory 
Non-Linear Crystals and Elaborations Laboratory

International Collaboration 
There is active collaboration with worldwide scientific groups, in particular with France, Germany, USA, etc. Visit the IPR website for the list all collaborators and for the ongoing grant list.

In particular, there are several European Seventh Framework Programs running: 
 ERA project IPERA (2011-2014), involving Armenia, France and Luxembourg,
 COSMA (2012-2016), involving Italy, United Kingdom, Bulgaria, Israel, Armenia, Russia, India, Poland, USA,
 TheBarCode (2013-2016) involving Greece, Russia, Germany, Belarus, Armenia, Romania, Romania, Greece, Belgium, UK, Russia, 
 LIMACONA project (2013-2016) involving UK, Italy, Germany, Russia, Ukraine, Armenia,
 NANOMAT-EPC (2013-2016) involving Luxembourg, Germany, France, UK, Armenia, Belarus, Georgia, Ukraine,
 Secure-R2I (2013-2016) Luxembourg, Greece, Estonia, Moldova, Armenia, Belarus, Georgia, Ukraine.

See also 
 Yerevan Physics Institute

External links 
Official website
National Academy of Sciences of Armenia

Research institutes established in 1967
Science and technology in Armenia
Research institutes in Armenia
Research institutes in the Soviet Union
1967 establishments in the Soviet Union